Vargas Llosa is the surname of two prominent Peruvian intellectuals who are father and son. 
Mario Vargas Llosa, born in 1936, is a novelist, journalist, politician and essayist, winner of the Nobel Prize for Literature 2010.
Álvaro Vargas Llosa, born in 1966, is a writer and political commentator on international affairs.

Although the name appears to consist of a first name, a middle name and a last name, Vargas Llosa is in fact the complete surname (Spanish-speaking countries use a paternal last name followed by a maternal last name), and falls alphabetically under the letter V. In a library, bookstore, bibliography or similar place, it is not correct to file the works of either of these authors under the letter L or Ll.